"The Key of the Door" was the twelfth episode of the first series of the British television series, Upstairs, Downstairs. The episode is set in the winter of 1908.

"The Key of the Door" was among the episodes omitted from Upstairs, Downstairs''' initial Masterpiece Theatre broadcast in 1974, and was consequently not shown on US television until 1988.

Plot
In Winter 1908 Elizabeth Bellamy is influenced by Evelyn Larkin and makes a party for Larkin's bohemian companions, in which she falls in love with the poet Lawrence Kirbridge.

References

External links
Updown.org.uk - Upstairs, Downstairs'' Fansite

Upstairs, Downstairs (series 1) episodes
1972 British television episodes
Fiction set in 1907